Richard John may refer to:

 Richard John (general) (1896–1965), Generalleutnant in the Wehrmacht during World War II
 Richard John (soldier) (1916–2010), Oberfeldwebel in the Wehrmacht during World War II
 Richard R. John (born 1959), historian of communications

See also